Sam Johnson and Chris Marcil are an American television writing and television production team.

Producing credits
How I Met Your Mother (consulting producers)
Frasier (executive producers)
NewsRadio (executive producers & executive story editors)
The Troop (executive producers)
Hot in Cleveland (executive producers)

Writing credits
How I Met Your Mother
Jake in Progress
Frasier
Daria
NewsRadio
Beavis and Butt-head
Beavis and Butt-head in Virtual Stupidity
The Brothers Grunt
The Adventures of Pete & Pete
The Assistants
The Troop
Hot in Cleveland
What We Do in the Shadows

Acting credits
Frasier, Beavis and Butt-head in Virtual Stupidity, and Beavis and Butt-head

Awards and nominations
Marcil was nominated for 3 Primetime Emmys. Johnson was nominated for 5 Primetime Emmys.

References

External links

American male television actors
American television producers
American television writers
Place of birth missing (living people)
Year of birth missing (living people)
American male television writers
Screenwriting duos
Living people